Solángel Guzmán Pérez (born 21 December 1984) is a Cuban female badminton player, and now represented Trinidad and Tobago. Guzman was a top badminton player in Cuba, where she became a Pan Am Games doubles quarter-finalist, a CAC singles champion and also medalled at the Peru Open, as well as tournaments in Brazil, Venezuela and Dominican Republic. Since arriving in T&T, she has also dominated the local badminton scene, taking the triple crown in every tournament.

Achievements

Pan Am Championships
Women's singles

Central American and Caribbean Games 
Women's singles

Women's doubles

Mixed doubles

BWF International Challenge/Series 
Women's singles

Women's doubles

Mixed doubles

 BWF International Challenge tournament
 BWF International Series tournament
 BWF Future Series tournament

References

External links
 

1984 births
Living people
People from Pinar del Río
Trinidad and Tobago female badminton players
Cuban female badminton players
Badminton players at the 2007 Pan American Games
Pan American Games competitors for Cuba
Central American and Caribbean Games gold medalists for Cuba
Central American and Caribbean Games silver medalists for Cuba
Competitors at the 2006 Central American and Caribbean Games
Central American and Caribbean Games medalists in badminton